Super Mutants are a fictional race of posthuman beings from the post-apocalyptic Fallout video game franchise. Within series lore, Super Mutants are originally ordinary human beings that have been mutated to be much larger and stronger as a result of exposure to a genetically engineered viral mutagen. The Super Mutants of the Fallout series tend to be depicted as savage and innately violent beings who, as a result of their transformations, lost a substantial amount of intelligence and often have cannibalistic tendencies. While Super Mutants tend to form their own factions or societies and are usually hostile to civilized humans, some have chosen to live peacefully alongside humans in settlements across the post-apocalyptic wasteland. 

Among the most recognizable and integral elements of the Fallout intellectual property (IP), Super Mutants have appeared in every media of the franchise, and have been the subject of numerous fan mods of Fallout series games. Certain individual Super Mutant characters have been well received by critics for their characterization, although the role the Super Mutant race have played throughout the history of the franchise have been the source of contention for some commentators.

Characteristics
The Super Mutants of the Fallout series were first introduced in 1997's Fallout as the results of human experimentation with a strain of the Forced Evolutionary Virus (FEV), which transforms the subjects into a hulking monstrous humanoid form. The FEV, an artificially-created virus by a defense contractor and research corporation contracted by the American government, was originally meant to protect against various forms of biological warfare. Subsequent games in the Fallout series feature other antagonistic factions that employ different strains of the FEV to create Super Mutants. For example, Vault Tec, the technology company which built the nuclear fallout shelter facilities called Vaults, deliberately exposed the occupants of Vault 87 to a modified strain of the FEV as part of an unethical experiment called the Evolutionary Experimentation Program. The Institute, an elusive faction of scientists in Fallout 4, kidnap the inhabitants of the surrounding region and subject their victims to another strain of FEV for experimentation. Super Mutants created by the Institute are less intelligent compared to other variants but are capable of speaking like normal humans.

The physiology of a Super Mutant is very different compared to ordinary humans; the most immediately noticeable effects are their immense size and strength, their different skin color, and their immunity to radiation damage. A standard Super Mutant's skin tone is usually green or yellow and stands approximately 10.4 feet tall, 7.8 feet when hunching, and weighs around 800 pounds. The Nightkin, an elite Super Mutant caste, have gray-blue colored skin and largely retain their pre-existing intellect unlike their lesser brethren. They are often equipped with cloaking devices known as "Stealth Boys" and developed schizophrenia from prolonged use. Other varieties of Super Mutants encountered in Fallout 3 and Fallout 4 grow much larger when they age. An immensely large variety first introduced in Fallout 3, the Behemoth, stand at roughly 20 feet tall and could grow up to 30 feet in height.

In comparison to the series' other notable mutated beings like ghouls, Super Mutants are very formidable opponents in combat. Behemoths in particular are capable of overpowering opponents like Deathclaws and hordes of Feral Ghouls with little difficulty, and are unexpectedly nimble for their size. In spite of their physically impressive qualities, Super Mutants are sterile and cannot reproduce as the gametes of the reproductive system consist of "half-cells" using split DNA, which could be perceived as "damage" by the FEV, and in the attempt to "repair" them, it would render the subject infertile.

Development 
Concept artist Adam Adamowicz was responsible for conceptualizing the Fallout 3 iteration of the Super Mutant, in particular the Behemoth variant. In a 2008 developmental diary titled "Conceptual Design", Adamowicz said he was inspired by a line of dialogue from the 1974 film Blazing Saddles about the dim-witted but strong and tough character Mongo, Adamowicz wanted the game's Super Mutants to look like "they would step into a tree shredder, for relaxation.". He described their musculature to be straining at the bone structure underneath, evoking a caricature of a person with well developed muscles "in the throes of radioactive testosterone poisoning, and liking it". The armor and equipment used by the Super Mutants of Fallout 3 are predominantly based on salvaged material, such as car hoods and fenders crudely pounded into chest plates and pauldrons, and lawn mower blades welded onto helmets. The idea behind this design approach is to show recognizable real world elements being twisted to a more violent purpose, which conveys a sinister resourcefulness by these creatures to survive in a highly dangerous post-apocalyptic world.

Adamowicz noted that his “junkyard wars” approach to designing the Super Mutants' armor and weapons inspired a number outlandish designs for homemade weapons, with some of them implemented in the final game. Adamowicz incorporated numerous visual gags into the character design for the Behemoths; examples given include their wielding of parking meters as if they are police batons and carrying their victims bound by shopping carts on their backs, which they will occasionally consume when they get hungry.

Obsidian Entertainment, the developers of Fallout: New Vegas, initially considered allowing players the opportunity to play as a ghoul or a Super Mutant for their protagonist in New Vegas. The team faced technical limitations as New Vegas shared the same engine as Fallout 3, and the developers realized that the game engine's equipment system would not work properly for player characters which use non-human character models after Bethesda provided advice discouraging the addition of the proposed feature. Modiphius founder Chris Birch said the inclusion of Super Mutants as a playable race in the officially licensed Fallout tabletop roleplaying game, developed by his company to be part of their design decision to make the game "authentically Fallout".

Appearances
Super Mutants have appeared in every Fallout video game as both non-player characters and hostile antagonists. They are first introduced in the first Fallout as part of an ambitious effort by a grotesque mutated being known as "The Master of the Super Mutants", to create a single, perfect "master race" and remove inequalities which have been the cause of strife among humans. The Master was originally Dr. Richard Moreau, who was accused of murder and exiled from his home Vault. He later befriended a wasteland trader named Harold, whose caravans had been increasingly harassed by mutant creatures. The two organized an expedition to find out where these mutants were coming from, but their followers were wiped out when the group discovered the Mariposa Military Base and attempted to breach its defenses. Richard ultimately fell into a vat of FEV in the base but survived; driven insane and severely mutated, he calls himself "The Master" and begins experimenting with FEV using animals and - as "visitors" arrive - humans. The Master's goal involves punishing and ultimately replacing humanity with his Super Mutants due to their ineptness and misuse of nuclear technology, with the menace of the resulting Super Mutant army known as Unity driving the game's main narrative. Harold also survives and transforms into a unique mutated creature due to his exposure to the FEV at Mariposa, and makes recurring appearances throughout the series as a friendly non-player character.

Following the death of The Master at the ending of the original Fallout, the remnants of his Unity organization are hunted by the Brotherhood of Steel, who would label them "Frankenstein's Monsters" as a derogatory term. Survivors scatter from their base of operations beneath a cathedral and go their separate ways to find a new purpose: some resort to become raiders and resume their violent ways against humanity, while individuals like Marcus and Lily Bowen congregate together in non-violent communities and attempt to live in peace with humans and ghouls.

Players could recruit Super Mutant characters as traveling companions or allies in the sequel to 1997's Fallout. Noteworthy companion characters throughout the series include Marcus in Fallout 2, Fawkes in Fallout 3, Lily Bowen in Fallout: New Vegas, and Strong in Fallout 4. Super Mutants are available as a playable race in the Fallout tabletop roleplaying game released in 2021.

Cultural impact

Promotion and merchandise
Super Mutants are featured as part of a range of Fallout-themed Funko Pop figurines which were first released in 2015, and are described one of the franchise's "iconic characters". Super Mutants have been marketed as figurines for Fallout: Wasteland Warfare, a miniatures wargame which adapts the Fallout universe.

Critical reception and analysis
Commenting on Adamowicz's developer diary post in 2008, Joseph Leray from Destructoid praised the creative vision and art style for the Super Mutants of Fallout 3 as "delightfully twisted", and said these aesthetic elements were key ingredients "that makes post-apocalyptic stories work". Some of the best side quests in Fallout 4 according to The Escapist's Ron Whitaker involve conflicts with Super Mutants, with one that culminates in the recruitment of Strong as a companion character noted to be a highlight by Whitaker. Some individual Super Mutant characters have received critical acclaim. For example, the Nightkin character Lily Bowen has been praised for her characterization and has appeared in "top" character lists, including Polygon's "The 70 best video game characters of the decade".

In a paper published by the University of Leicester, Conor Appleton scaled an ordinary Super Mutant up to the size of a Behemoth and used dimensional analysis to determine the plausibility and viability of such a creature's existence. After examining the Behemoth's physiology using in-universe data and discussing how it may be affected by gravity, Appleton concluded that it is unlikely that such a creature would survive in reality.

Fandom
Super Mutants are a recognizable element of the Fallout franchise. Some characters are particularly popular with players. Fawkes from Fallout 3 was among the top-voted characters in a RPG character poll organized by IGN in 2014. Super Mutant characters and their physiology are also the subject of popular works derived from fan labor, such as mods, music videos and fan films.

On the other hand, the portrayal of Super Mutants following the transition of the series' ownership to Bethesda have been a source of contention for some fans. Story elements introduced in Fallout 3 contradicted lore in the first Fallout, developed by series creators Interplay Entertainment, which established that Super Mutants were originally created by the Master in 2103, while the Vault 87 FEV experiment took place in 2078. In a report about the Fallout fansite, No Mutants Allowed, Luke Winkie from Kotaku highlighted criticism from community members about the creative and design decisions in video games developed by Bethesda Game Studios: one aspect of contention involved the ubiquity of Super Mutants as ordinary "mob bad guys" in the early game levels of Fallout 3, which departed from the perspective of escalation presented in the original games' stories, gameplay mechanics and setting. The presence of Super Mutants in Fallout 76 also proved to be a controversial retcon with series fandom, as the game established that its iteration of Super Mutants is native to the region and thus unrelated to the Super Mutants in previous games.

See also
Hulk, a superhero character with similar traits
Orc, a similar species of cannibals and raiders associated with high fantasy

References

External links
Super Mutant at the Fallout Wiki

Bethesda characters
Fallout (series)
Fictional monsters
Genetically engineered characters in video games
Microsoft antagonists
Mutant characters in video games
Science fiction video game characters
Video game characters introduced in 1997
Video game species and races
Fictional super soldiers